Houlberthosia is a genus of moths in the family Noctuidae. It contains only one species, Houlberthosia ornatissima, which is found in Vietnam and Taiwan.

Subspecies
Houlberthosia ornatissima ornatissima (Taiwan)
Houlberthosia ornatissima speideli G. Ronkay, L. Ronkay, P. Gyulai & Hacker, 2010 (Vietnam)

References

	

Orthosiini
Monotypic moth genera
Moths of Asia